A salmon pool is a name for a rocky depression in a riverbed, where salmon are known to gather to rest and feed, and from where they can be successfully caught. In England, they are known as stells.

Known salmon pools
Monks Brook
Matapedia River
Chéticamp River
Miramichi River
New Brunswick has more than 22
Bangor Salmon Pool
 Underground Salmon Pool near Roddickton, Newfoundland

Former salmon pools
Salmon pools are located in the shallows of rivers. Dams and other activities that raise the heights of rivers can ruin pools for fishing.

Hartland Salmon Pool

See also 
Environmental issues with salmon

References

External links 
 Salmon FAQ

Salmon
Fishing areas